John N. Doggett III is an American award-winning Professor of Instruction at the McCombs School of Business of The University of Texas at Austin (UT).  Doggett was born in San Francisco, California on October 26, 1947 and raised in Pasadena and Los Angeles, California.

Doggett teaches MBA courses about entrepreneurship, global competition, and sustainability.  Doggett is a former Chair of the University Faculty Advisory Committee on Budgets.  Doggett is also the Academic Director of the UT Mandela Washington Fellowship for Young African Leaders – Leadership in Business Institute.

Doggett spent several weeks during the first decade of the 21st century as a visiting professor teaching courses in entrepreneurship and global competition at Aoyama Gakuin University in Tokyo, Japan, the Chinese University of Hong Kong, IMADEC University in Vienna, Austria, Thammasat University in Bangkok, Thailand and Porto Business School, in Porto, Portugal.

Doggett has taught courses on entrepreneurship and venture capital in Austria, Chile, China, Ghana, Hong Kong, Japan, Malaysia, Mexico, Portugal, Singapore, South Korea, Taiwan, and Thailand.  He has extensive experience working with companies and trade associations in a wide range of industries, including electric utilities, oil, gas, and coal, manufacturing, retail, transportation, software and non-profit.

Doggett is a serial entrepreneur.  From 1983 to 1993 he created and managed an international economic development management consulting company that worked with clients in 25 countries in Africa, Asia, the Caribbean, Central America and the Middle East.  At its peak, his firm had 30 employees and offices in Austin, Texas and Accra, Ghana.  Doggett then co-founded a Spanish Language Sports Television Programming company that had a three year exclusive contract with the National Football League to produce programs about NFL football in Spanish.  At its peak, in 1996, his firm broadcast programs in 54 cities in the US, Northern Mexico and Puerto Rico.

From 1998-1998, Doggett was the host of The John Doggett Show on KVET-AM in Austin, Texas.  Doggett's radio talk show was one of the most influential afternoon talk shows in Central Texas.  In January 1997, Texas Monthly called Mr. Doggett a “Hot Radio Personality” “who allows listeners to disagree with him without cutting them off.”   In March 1997 the New York Times published two articles about The John Doggett Show.  In August 1997, C-SPAN simulcast Mr. Doggett’s show nationally. In February 1998, Talker’s Magazine selected Mr. Doggett as one of the 100 Most Influential Talk Show Hosts in America.  Doggett's show ended when his radio station dropped talk and became a 24-hour sports station.

Doggett is a co-author of When We Are the Foreigners: What Chinese Think about Working with Americans.  Doggett also was a co-executive producer of Shakespeare on the Range, a short film about Louisiana prisoners learning how to become actors in the stage play Macbeth.

Doggett was a columnist for WorldNetDaily until December 2002. In 1997, Headway Magazine selected him as one of the 20 Most Influential Black Conservatives in America. The following year, Talkers Magazine selected him as one of the 100 Most Influential Radio Talk Show Hosts in America.

In 1991, Doggett testified before the U.S. Senate Judiciary Committee on behalf of Clarence Thomas, during Thomas' SCOTUS confirmation hearings.https://www.c-span.org/video/?22288-1/thomas-hearing-day-3-part-5 (Thomas, who had been nominated to the U.S. Supreme Court by then-President George Herbert Walker Bush, had been accused of sexual harassment by law professor Anita Hill.)

Doggett is an alumnus of Claremont McKenna College, where he was the founder of the Black Student Union.

Doggett is also an alumnus of Yale Law School, and Harvard Business School.  Doggett and his wife have been married since February, 2001.

See also
Black conservatism in the United States

References

External links
 

American columnists
African-American non-fiction writers
American political writers
American male non-fiction writers
Writers from Texas
African-American radio personalities
African-American lawyers
American lawyers
African-American educators
American educators
Living people
Year of birth missing (living people)
21st-century African-American people
McCombs School of Business faculty
Claremont McKenna College alumni
Yale Law School alumni
Harvard Business School alumni